Hawk Incentives (formerly Blackhawk Engagement Solutions, Parago, and InteliSpend), is a rewards-based incentives company that design, implement and manage programs for other companies. Hawk Incentives is based in Texas.

Hawk Incentives has become one of the larger providers of manufacturer and retailer promotional marketing programs, including rebates and incentives programs. The Company has been a major player in the popularization of paperless rebates and prepaid rebate card programs.
In 2009 the company released research showing that 83% of consumers were seeking products with rebates. In addition, the company has received significant industry recognition for its research into customer loyalty, rewards programs and prepaid cards. In 2009, Parago received an A+ rating from the Dallas Better Business Bureau.  However, as of April 2015, the BBB has received over 200 complaints against Parago and the rating has been lowered to B+.

Some of Hawk Incentive's clients include Netgear, Sprint Nextel and Staples Inc. For Staples, Hawk Incentives is credited with redesigning and managing the popular Easy Rebates program, which enables customers to use paperless submission for rebates, offers a choice of rewards and quick payment. After a decade of working together, Staples extended its contract with Parago for another five years in 2010.

The firm has experienced significant growth and expansion in the early 2000s. In 2004, Parago launched a rewards and loyalty marketing division expanding their line of services. In 2010, Parago was named one of the fastest growing women-owned or led businesses in North America, as judged by the Women President’s Organization. The same year, Parago ranked number 19 on PROMO magazine’s 2010 PROMO 100 list of the top U.S. promotion agencies  and Spottiswood was named one of the Top 25 Industry Leaders by the Dallas Business Journal’s Women in Business Awards.
  In September, 2014, Parago was purchased by publicly traded Blackhawk Network, a leading prepaid and payments network, for $290 million.

In 2009, former Parago President and CEO Juli Spottiswood was recognized as the Ernst & Young Entrepreneur of The Year 2009 in the business services category in Southwest Area-North. The same year, the Company was selected as one of the best places to work in Dallas, through the Dallas Business Journal awards program.

In 2004, the leader of Parago's loyalty marketing division, Chris Moloney, published extensive research on customer loyalty and referral which appeared in the book Strategic Database Marketing, 3rd Edition by Arthur Middleton Hughes of KBM.

The Company was founded in 1999 as the “how to” website How2.com. In 2001, the company shifted its business to rebate and reward programs. Parago was founded by venture capital firm T. H. Lee of New York and was formerly known by the name Parago Rebates HQ.

References

External links 
 The Great Rebate Runaround
 site

Marketing companies established in 1999
1999 establishments in Texas